The New York City mayoral election of 1997 occurred on Tuesday November 4, 1997, with incumbent Republican mayor Rudy Giuliani soundly defeating Democratic Manhattan Borough President Ruth Messinger and several third-party candidates.

History
Giuliani's opponent in 1997 was Democratic Manhattan Borough President Ruth Messinger, who had beaten Al Sharpton in the Democratic primary on September 9, 1997. The results of the Democratic primary were contested in court by Sharpton, who argued that he qualified for a run-off election with Messinger. Sharpton waited until October to endorse Messinger against Giuliani, and the endorsement was perceived by some as tepid.

In the general election, Giuliani had the Republican and Liberal ballot lines, but not the Conservative line. Giuliani had run on the same two ballot lines in his unsuccessful 1989 mayoral campaign and in his winning campaign in 1993. Conservative Party leaders were unhappy with Giuliani on ideological grounds, citing the Liberal Party's endorsement statement that Giuliani "agreed with the Liberal Party's views on affirmative action, gun control, school prayer and tuition tax credits."

Giuliani ran an aggressive campaign, parlaying his image as a tough leader who had cleaned up the city. Giuliani's popularity was at its highest point to date, with a late October 1997 Quinnipiac University Polling Institute poll showing him as having a 68% approval rating; 70% of New Yorkers were satisfied with life in the city and 64% said things were better in the city compared to four years previously.

Throughout the campaign, Giuliani was well ahead in the polls and had a strong fundraising advantage over Messinger. On her part, Messinger lost the support of several usually Democratic constituencies, including gay organizations and large labor unions. All four daily New York newspapers—The New York Times, New York Daily News, New York Post, and Newsday—endorsed Giuliani over Messinger. Two televised debates were held, but Messinger was unable to get traction in highlighting that Giuliani was interested in higher office and might not serve out a full second term.  Messinger claimed that the real mayor was not in evidence during the debates: "Let me point out that we're certainly seeing the nice Rudy Giuliani tonight."

In the end, Giuliani won 58% of the vote to Messinger's 41%, becoming the first Republican to win a second term as Mayor of New York City since Fiorello H. LaGuardia in 1941. Voter turnout was the lowest in 12 years, with only 38% of registered voters casting ballots. The margin of victory was not quite as large as pre-election polls had predicted; analysis of the vote showed that Giuliani made modest gains amongst African-American and Hispanic voters while maintaining his solid base of white, Asian and Jewish voters from 1993.

In his acceptance speech, Giuliani acknowledged the image of divisiveness he had acquired during his first term and vowed to correct it: "Whether you voted for me or against me, whether you voted or didn't vote, I'm your Mayor, this is your administration. We have to do a better job of serving all of you. We have to reach out to all of you. And if we haven't, I apologize. I'm sorry and it is my personal commitment that we will try, endlessly and tirelessly, to bring all of you into the kind of success and optimism we have in this room."

The losing Messinger said, "Tonight, we lost a battle but the war goes on ... Our schools still don't work ... and they are still worth fighting for. We gave it everything we had."

General election results

Voter demographics

References

Mayoral election
1997
New York City mayoral
New York
Rudy Giuliani
November 1997 events in the United States